Etiracetam is a chemical compound belonging to the racetam family, which was developed as a nootropic drug. It is racemic; its biologically active enantiomeric form is levetiracetam, now marketed as an antiepileptic drug.

See also 
Piracetam

References 

Racetams
Carboxamides